The 1952 New Hampshire gubernatorial election was held on November 4, 1952. Republican nominee Hugh Gregg defeated Democratic nominee William H. Craig with 63.15% of the vote.

Primary elections
Primary elections were held on September 9, 1952.

Republican primary

Candidates
Hugh Gregg, former Mayor of Nashua
Charles F. Stafford, member of the Executive Council of New Hampshire
Robert O. Blood, former Governor
Elmer E. Bussey

Results

General election

Candidates
Hugh Gregg, Republican
William H. Craig, Democratic

Results

References

1952
New Hampshire
Gubernatorial